RHM may refer to:

RHM, the FWB code for Rheinmetall, a German defence company
RHM, the National Rail code for Reedham railway station (London), Purley, London, England
Rank Hovis McDougall, a defunct United Kingdom food business
Revista Hispánica Moderna, a peer-reviewed academic journal which focuses on research in Hispanic and Luso-Brazilian literature and culture